Targum Jonathan is a western targum (interpretation) of the Torah (Pentateuch) from the land of Israel (as opposed to the eastern Babylonian Targum Onkelos). Its correct title was originally Targum Yerushalmi (Jerusalem Targum), which is how it was known in medieval times. But because of a printer's mistake it was later labeled Targum Jonathan, in reference to Jonathan ben Uzziel.  Some editions of the Pentateuch continue to call it Targum Jonathan to this day. Most scholars refer to the text as Targum Pseudo-Jonathan or TPsJ.

This targum is more than a mere translation. It includes much aggadic material collected from various sources as late as the Midrash Rabbah as well as earlier material from the Talmud. So it is a combination of a commentary and a translation. In the portions where it is pure translation, it often agrees with the Targum Onkelos.

Authorship
The Talmud relates that Yonatan ben Uziel, a student of Hillel the Elder, fashioned an Aramaic translation of the Nevi'im. It makes no mention of any translation by him of the Torah. So all scholars agree that this Targum was not authored by Yonatan ben Uziel. Indeed, Azariah dei Rossi (16th century) reports that he saw two very similar complete Targumim to the Torah, one called Targum Yonatan Ben Uziel and the other called Targum Yerushalmi. A standard explanation is that the original title of this work was Targum Yerushalmi, which was abbreviated to ת"י (TY), and these initials were then incorrectly expanded to Targum Yonatan which was then further incorrectly expanded to Targum Yonatan ben Uziel. For these reasons, scholars call it "Targum Pseudo-Jonathan".

The first of these manuscripts cited by de Rossi is thought to have been the basis of the first printing in Venice (1591) where the false title Targum Yonatan ben Uziel is used. The second manuscript – the only known one to still exist – is in the British Museum and was published by Ginsburger in 1903.

The date of its composition is disputed. 
The majority opinion, on the basis of much internal evidence, is that it cannot date from before the early Muslim conquests despite incorporating some older material. For example, Ishmael's wife is called by the legendary Arabic name Fatimah.
Gottlieb puts the time of composition toward the end of the 12th century.
On the other hand, since the Geonim are unfamiliar with it, and Rashi does not mention it, Rieder puts the composition some time after Rashi, perhaps during the period of the crusades. 
On any view, it cannot have been composed later than the early 14th century, as it is referred to repeatedly by Rabbi Menahem Recanati (1250–1310) in his Perush 'Al ha-Torah.
 A 2006 analysis by Beverly Mortensen dates Targum Pseudo-Jonathan to the 4th century and regards it as a manual for kohanim.

See also
Targum
Targum Jonathan
Targum Onkelos
Torah

References

External links 
English translation of text

Pseudo-Jonathan
Translators of the Bible into Aramaic
Hebrew Bible versions and translations